Cantharolethrus luxerii is a species of stag beetle.

References

Lucaninae
Beetles described in 1843